Hiran may refer to:

Places
 Hiran, Iran, a village in Isfahan Province
 Hiran, Somalia, an administrative region in central Somalia
 Ngoenyang, or Hiran, a 7th- to 13th-century kingdom of the Northern Thai people

People
 Hiran Chatterjee, an Indian actor
 Hiran Deraniyagala, a guitarist for heavy metal band Battlecross